Ali Abbas Sabeh (born 24 June 1994) is a Lebanese footballer who plays as a goalkeeper for  club Nejmeh and the Lebanon national team.

International career
Sabeh made his debut for Lebanon in a 3–2 defeat against the United Arab Emirates on 6 November 2014. In July 2019, he was called up for the 2019 WAFF Championship squad, but withdrew injured and was replaced by Ali Daher on 31 July.

Sabeh's second cap came on 7 December 2021, over seven years from his debut, keeping a clean sheet in a 1–0 win over Sudan in the 2021 FIFA Arab Cup.

Career statistics

International

Honours 
Nejmeh
 Lebanese FA Cup: 2021–22; runner-up: 2020–21
 Lebanese Elite Cup: 2017, 2018, 2021
 Lebanese Super Cup runner-up: 2021

References

External links

 
 
 
 
 

1994 births
Living people
Lebanese footballers
Nejmeh SC players
Association football goalkeepers
Lebanon international footballers
Lebanese Premier League players
Footballers from Beirut
Lebanon youth international footballers
Lebanese Second Division players